Lianping County (postal: Linping) is a county of northeastern Guangdong province, China, bordering Jiangxi to the north. It is under the administration of Heyuan City.

Climate

References

 
County-level divisions of Guangdong
Heyuan